The Australian Greens have had four federal leadership elections in their history. On each occasion, a single candidate was elected unopposed.

2005

The Greens had their first leadership election on 29 November 2005; prior to this they did not have a party leader, preferring a consultative model of government. At a party conference in Hobart, the Greens announced their intention to formalise their party's structure in anticipation of a growing presence in Federal Parliament. Tasmanian Senator Bob Brown was elected leader unopposed, with Western Australian Senator Rachel Siewert appointed the party's first Whip.

2010 deputy

The Greens had a deputy leadership spill in 2010 following the 2010 Australian federal election. The role was contested by Senator for Tasmania Christine Milne and Senator for South Australia Sarah Hanson-Young. Hanson-Young was critical of the Greens supporting the minority Labor Gillard Government, and wanted the party to negotiate with the Liberal Party, while Milne wished to critically maintain the agreement. The election was won by Christine Milne.

2012

Brown served as party leader until 13 April 2012, when he announced his retirement from politics. The Greens parliamentary party room was immediately convened to appoint a new leader and deputy leader. Christine Milne, Senator from Tasmania, was elected unopposed to the leadership.

Deputy election

The deputy leader seat was contested between Adam Bandt, the member for Melbourne in the House of Representatives, and Sarah Hanson-Young. Bandt became the second Greens MP to be elected to the position of deputy leader of the party, Milne having previously filled the role after its establishment in 2008. The leadership election had no effect on the deal that existed between the governing Gillard Labor Government and the Greens, to which Milne remained a signatory.

2015

On the morning of 6 May 2015, Christine Milne announced on Twitter her resignation from the position of leader of the Greens, prompting a meeting of the Greens' parliamentary party room to fill her replacement. Shortly after her announcement, Victorian Senator Richard Di Natale revealed he would stand as a candidate for the leadership, whilst the media speculated incumbent deputy leader Adam Bandt would seek re-election to the position. At the party room meeting however, Bandt did not seek re-election to the deputy leadership, later saying he was "happy" to hand over the role and instead focus on the birth of his partner's baby. Consequently, the party decided to elect two senators as co-deputy leaders; Scott Ludlam and Larissa Waters.

Di Natale was elected to the leadership unopposed and he became the first leader of the Australian Greens to represent a state other than Tasmania.

2020

The 2020 Australian Greens leadership election began on 3 February, after incumbent Richard Di Natale announced his resignation as federal leader of the Greens. He also announced his plan to retire from federal parliament in the coming months. On the day of his announcement, Greens MP for the seat of Melbourne Adam Bandt, revealed he would contest the party's leadership. A party-room election for the leadership was held the following day, and Bandt was elected unopposed to the leadership position. He became the first Greens member of the House of Representatives, and not the Senate, to be elected leader.

Deputy election

The positions of co-deputy leaders were also filled at the meeting. Three senators, Nick McKim, Larissa Waters, and Mehreen Faruqi contested the role. Larissa Waters was re-elected to the role, with Nick McKim joining her.

2022

On the 10th of June, almost three weeks after the 2022 Australian federal election, the Australian Greens members of parliament met and re-elected Adam Bandt as federal leader of the Greens, "by consensus". Bandt was sick with COVID-19 and was unable to attend the meeting. The party elected Mehreen Faruqi as deputy leader, replacing Larissa Waters, as well as Larissa Waters as the party's Leader in the Senate, Lidia Thorpe as the Deputy Leader in the Senate, Sarah Hanson-Young as Manager of Greens Business in the Senate, Janet Rice as Party Room Chair, and Nick McKim as Senate Whip.

References

Australian Greens
Australian leadership spills